A loosely associated statement is a type of simple non-inferential passage wherein statements about a general subject are juxtaposed but make no inferential claim.  As a rhetorical device, loosely associated statements may be intended by the speaker to infer a claim or conclusion, but because they lack a coherent logical structure any such interpretation is subjective as loosely associated statements prove nothing and attempt no obvious conclusion.  Loosely associated statements can be said to serve no obvious purpose, such as illustration or explanation.

Included statements can be premises, conclusions or both, and both true or false, but missing from the passage is a claim that any one statement supports another.

Examples 
In A concise introduction to logic, Hurley demonstrates the concept with a quote by Lao-Tzu:

While each clause in the quote may seem related to the others, each provides no reason to believe another.

References 

Logic
Propaganda techniques
Rhetoric
Statements